Peter Schulz (25 April 1930 – 17 May 2013) was a German politician, member of the Social Democratic Party (SPD) and First Mayor of Hamburg (1971 – 1974).

Schulz was born in Rostock. He studied law at the University of Hamburg and after his graduation in 1958 Schulz founded his own office.

Political life
In 1961 he was elected in the Hamburg Parliament and served as Senator of Justice from 1966. In 1970 he became Senator for Schools and Youth and Second Mayor. On 16 June 1971 he was elected as First Mayor of Hamburg but resigned after the 1974 election, on 12 November 1974.

1978 – 1982 and 1983 – 1986 Schulz was President of Hamburg Parliament.

References

External links

Schulz Noack Bärwinkel – Lawyers office homepage

1930 births
2013 deaths
People from Rostock
Social Democratic Party of Germany politicians
Members of the Hamburg Parliament
Mayors of Hamburg
Sozialistischer Deutscher Studentenbund members
University of Hamburg alumni